White pipe clay (Dutch: pijpaarde) is a white-firing clay of the sort that is used to make tobacco smoking pipes, which tended to be treated as disposable objects.  This suited pipeclay, which is not very strong. 

Such clays are not uncommon; in England they are found in the river Thames upstream from London, and in the Low Countries the clay was found in deposits of the Rhine and Meuse rivers and in the 16th-century centres of production for white pipe clay objects were Cologne, Utrecht, Liège and Gouda, South Holland. The name comes from the most common usage of white pipe clay, tobacco pipes.

Devotional figures

In archaeological digs in the Netherlands, small white devotional figurines have been found, but more importantly, several recent digs in cities have uncovered the molds used to press these small figurines. Forty figurines and twenty-eight parts of figurines were discovered on the Oude Varkenmarkt in Leiden in a cesspit dating to the middle of the 15th century.

Goudse pijp
The Gouda pipe was a long-stemmed white tobacco pipe made in Gouda in the same way as the old figurines in a pressed mold. They became popular with the import of tobacco through the Dutch East India Company and later the Dutch West India Company. The pipes can be seen in a number of 17th-century paintings and are regularly found in archaeological digs in the Netherlands. They were continuously produced up to the 20th century.

In the 1911 Encyclopædia Britannica, Gouda was still known for its churchwarden pipes and even mentioned a winter pastime of skating while smoking from Rotterdam to Gouda without breaking such pipes.

References

Sculpture materials
Sediments
Tobacco smoking